Day and Night is a 1997 French drama film directed by public intellectual Bernard-Henri Lévy and starring Alain Delon, Lauren Bacall, Arielle Dombasle and Francisco Rabal.  The film follows a French author who fled to Mexico for a quiet life and an actress who is willing to seduce him to get a part in a film adapted from one of his books.

Plot
Alexandre (Alain Delon) is an ageing writer who lives as a monarch in the depths of Mexico. Surrounded by his court (strange and mysterious characters), he staves off boredom with alcohol, boxing, women and ballooning. Desiring to acquire the adaptation rights of Alexandre's first novel, film producer Filippi (Karl Zéro) and his actress Laure (Arielle Dombasle) soon arrive in the life of the celebrated author. Alexandre and Laure gradually become closer and set off extreme passions in the heart of the community.

Cast
 Alain Delon as Alexandre
 Lauren Bacall as Sonia
 Arielle Dombasle as Laure
 Karl Zéro as Filippi
 Francisco Rabal as Cristobal
 Marianne Denicourt as Ariane

Reception
The film opened in France on 74 screens and grossed $236,256 in its opening week, ranking 14th at the box office.
When the film premiered at the 47th Berlin International Film Festival in 1997, hundreds of journalists walked out of the screening and those that stayed audibly ridiculed the film.  Day and Night was considered the worst French film since 1945 by Cahiers du cinéma, and considered as a possible "worst film in history" by the French version of Slate.  Variety claimed that the film was, "Laugh-out-loud awful without touching the cult realm of 'so bad it's good," Françoise Giroud stated "It's a bad movie, there's no question", and L'Humanité called it an "Absolute debacle".  An original documentary, Anatomy of a Massacre, was released with the Day and Night DVD, and focused on the film's intense negative reception and failure.

References

External links

1997 films
1997 drama films
1990s French-language films
French drama films
Films about writers
Films set in Mexico
Films shot in Mexico
Films scored by Maurice Jarre
1990s French films